The women's masters competition at the 2018 Asian Games in Palembang was held on 26 and 27 August 2018 at Jakabaring Bowling Center.

The Masters event comprises the top 16 bowlers (maximum two per country) from the all-events category. Block 1 were played on long oil pattern lane, while Block 2 were played on medium oil pattern lane.

Schedule
All times are Western Indonesia Time (UTC+07:00)

Results

Preliminary

Stepladder finals

References

External links
Official website

Women's masters